Jatin Kanakia (28 June 1952 –18 July 1999), was an Indian actor. Best known for comedy roles, his career ranged from working in Gujarati plays, Hindi television shows and Hindi Bollywood movies. His skill and success earned him the informal title of being the "Prince of Comedy."

Career 
Kanakia's career began with roles in Gujarati and Hindi theatre, after which his first major television role was in the comedy series, Shrimaan Shrimati, where he played the lead role of Keshav Kulkarni, a married, middle-class house-holder who develops a crush on his movie star neighbour, played by Archana Puran Singh, and a rivalry with her husband, played by Rakesh Bedi, who in turn is drawn to Kulkarni's housewife Reema Lagoo. Broadcast on the national television network, Doordarshan, the series became one of India's most popular television shows. Kanakia also starred in shorter comedy series produced on Doordarshan and played cameos in other comedy series. He worked in many shows produced by the Adhikari Brothers production company, as well as by other producers.  Kanakia's success on television led to minor roles in big-budget Hindi films such as Hum Saath Saath Hain.

Death 
Kanakia's career was cut short on 26 July 1999 when he died from pancreatic cancer at the age of 46.

Awards 
Kanakia was honoured posthumously at the inaugural Indian Telly Awards in 2001 for his contribution to Indian television.

Filmography

Television 

 Mirch Masala
 Kamaal Hai Kamaal (Doordarshan)

Films

References

External links 
 

1952 births
1999 deaths
20th-century comedians
20th-century Indian male actors
Indian male comedians
Indian male stage actors
Indian male television actors
Male actors in Hindi cinema